Tanya Dubash (born 1968) is an Indian businesswoman, and an executive director and chief brand officer  at the Godrej Group,  and is known for taking up the responsibility for a rebranding exercise in 2008, Godrej Masterbrand Strategy. She serves on the boards of Godrej Industries Limited, Godrej Consumer Products Limited, Godrej Agrovet Limited. She was a board member of Bhartiya Mahila Bank and a trustee of Brown University. She is the elder daughter of the industrialist Adi Godrej.

Education 
Dubash attended The Cathedral & John Connon School, and is an A.B. (cum laude) in Economics & Political Science from Brown University, USA, and an alumna of Harvard Business School.

Career 
Dubash serves as the executive director and Chief Brand Officer of Godrej Industries Ltd. and is responsible for the Godrej Group's brand and communications function, including guiding the Godrej Masterbrand. She is the Director of Godrej Remote Services Ltd and Ensemble Holdings & Finance Ltd. She is a director of Godrej Industries Limited, Godrej Consumer Products Limited and Godrej Agrovet Limited and Godrej Finance Limited.

Other boards and committees 
Dubash was a Trustee of Brown University between 2012 and 2018. She is also a member of the Brown India Advisory Council and is on the Watson Institute board of overseers. Dubash was a member on the board of the Bharatiya Mahila Bank between November 2013 and May 2015. She serves on the board of Customer Value Foundation, AIESEC India and India@75.

She also serves on the Boards of Britannia, Escorts, Go Airlines,

Recognition
She was recognised by the World Economic Forum as a Young Global Leader in 2007. In India Today conclave 2010, Dubash spoke in general about the conflict between reality and idealism in which she focused on the Indian youth underlining her belief in idealism, if reality forces you to abandon your ideals, change reality.

Personal life 
Tanya is the first child of Adi and Parmeshwar Godrej. She has two younger siblings, a sister Nisaba Godrej who is the chairperson of Godrej Consumer Products and a brother, Pirojsha Adi Godrej who heads Godrej Properties, the business empire's real estate arm. She married Arvind Darab Dubash, an industrialist, in 1997. They live in Mumbai with their two sons Aryaan and Azaar.

References 

Businesspeople from Mumbai
Living people
1968 births
Indian women chief executives
Indian chief executives
Businesswomen from Maharashtra
20th-century Indian businesswomen
20th-century Indian businesspeople
21st-century Indian businesswomen
21st-century Indian businesspeople
Godrej family
Brown University alumni